Hygrocybe griseoramosa is a mushroom of the waxcap genus Hygrocybe. It is grey or fawn in colour, and generally grows in moist, shady conditions. A rare species, it is only found near Sydney. Also this species has been found growing in Tasmania. It was described in 2001 by the mycologist Anthony M. Young.

External links

References

Fungi described in 2001
Fungi of Australia
griseoramosa